Alan Breach Tayler  (1931–1995) was a British applied mathematician and pioneer of "industrial mathematics". He was a Founding Fellow of St Catherine's College, Oxford (1959-1995), the initiator of the Oxford Study Groups with Industry in 1968 (which developed into the European Study Groups with Industry), a driving force behind the foundation of the European Consortium for Mathematics in Industry (ECMI) in 1985 and President of ECMI (1989), and the first Director of the Oxford Centre for Industrial and Applied Mathematics (OCIAM) (1989–1994).

Personal life 

Alan Tayler was born in Mitcham, Surrey on 5 September 1931 and died in Ducklington, Oxfordshire on 29 January 1995. In 1955 he married June Earp and they had four daughters, one of whom pre-deceased him.

Education 

Alan Tayler was a scholar at King's College School, Wimbledon, London. Then we went up to Brasenose College, Oxford in 1951 where he gained a First in Mathematics and then, after a brief period in industry, a DPhil on "Problems in Compressible Flow" under the supervision of Professor George Temple in 1959.

Career 

Alan Tayler was a distinguished applied mathematician who made important contributions in a wide range of areas (notably lubrication theory, surface gravity waves and viscous dissipation), but his key contribution to science was as the driving force behind the establishment of what is often called "mathematics-in-industry" or "industrial mathematics" (i.e. the application of mathematical approaches to the modeling and analysis of a wide range of real-world problems) as a recognized scientific discipline in its own right. His philosophy is perfectly exemplified by the Oxford (now European) Study Groups with Industry which he and Professor Leslie Fox created in 1968 and are still going strong today. His approach to mathematical modelling is described in his seminal monograph "Mathematical Models in Applied Mechanics" (Oxford University Press, 1986), and is commemorated by the annual Alan Tayler Lecture held at the St Catherine's College, Oxford in November each year. During his career he supervised the DPhil research of several notable applied mathematicians, including Professor John Ockendon FRS and Professor John King.

In 1959 Alan Tayler became a University Lecturer and Tutorial Fellow at St Catherine's Society, Oxford, and was involved in its transformation into St Catherine's College, Oxford in 1962, where remained for the rest of his career. He was devoted to the College, and held several of its major offices, and also to the Oxford University Rugby Football Club, of which he was President (1990-1995).

Other work
He was on the governing body of Abingdon School from 1964-1983 and was the Vice-chairman of the Governors from 1972-1981.

Awards 

In 1982 Alan Tayler was jointly awarded (with Professor Sir James Lighthill, FRS) the Gold Medal of the Institute of Mathematics and its Applications (IMA) for his services to applied mathematics, and in 1993 he was appointed Commander of the Order of the British Empire (CBE) in 1993 for his services to applied science and industry.

References

20th-century English mathematicians
Commanders of the Order of the British Empire
1931 births
1995 deaths
Governors of Abingdon School
Mathematics education in the United Kingdom